Ribbon development refers to the building of houses along the routes of communications radiating from a human settlement. The resulting linear settlements are clearly visible on land use maps and aerial photographs, giving cities and the countryside a particular character. Such development generated great concern in the United Kingdom during the 1920s and the 1930s as well as in numerous other countries during the decades since.

Normally the very first ribbons are focused on roads. Following the Industrial Revolution, ribbon development became prevalent along railway lines, predominantly in Russia, the United Kingdom, and the United States. However, the investment required to build train stations, the ensuing attractiveness of easy rail access, and need for accompanying roads often led to new small settlements outside of the center city. Ribbon developments yielded attractive home locations on isolated roads as increasing motor car ownership meant that houses could be sold easily even if they were remote from workplaces and urban centres. Developers were pleased to not have to construct additional roads, thereby saving money and plot space. Ribbon developments also filed spaces at the interstice between urban areas, and resultingly appealed to potential buyers needing to access one or more of these locations.

The extent of this development practice around roads led to several problems becoming more intense. Ribbon developments were ultimately recognized as an inefficient use of resources, requiring bypass roads to be built, and often served as a precursor to untrammelled urban sprawl. Thus a key aim for the United Kingdom's post-war planning system was to implement a presumption and convention that rendered new ribbon developments undesirable. Urban sprawl/suburbanization of large areas led to the introduction of green belt policies, new towns, planned suburbs and garden cities.

History
Following the Industrial Revolution, ribbon development became prevalent along railway lines, predominantly in Russia, the United Kingdom, and the United States. The deliberate promotion of Metro-land along London's Metropolitan Railway serves as a strong example of this form of development. Similar examples can be found from Long Island (where Frederick W Dunton bought much real estate to encourage New Yorkers to settle along the Long Island Rail Road lines), Boston  and across the American Midwest.

Ribbon development is not restricted to construction along road or rail corridors, as it can also occur along ridge lines, canals and coastlines, the last of which occurs especially as people seeking seachange lifestyles build their houses for an optimal view.

The resulting towns and cities are often difficult to service efficiently due to their remoteness and lack of density. Often, the first problem noticed by residents is increased traffic congestion, as an increased number of people moves along the narrow urban corridor while development continues at the lengthening end of the corridor. Urban consolidation and smart city growth are often solutions that encourage growth towards a more compact urban form.

Ribbon development can also be compared with a linear village -- a village that grows linearly along a transportation route as part of a city's expansion into the frontier. They also lead to dispersion of functions, as the need for pockets of dense development that rely on each other becomes less important.

Ribbon development has long been viewed as a special problem in the Republic of Ireland, where "one-off houses" proliferate on rural roads. This causes difficulties in the efficient supply of water, sewerage, broadband, electricity, telephones and public transport. In 1998, Frank McDonald contrasted development in the Republic with that in Northern Ireland: "Enniskillen [in Northern Ireland] is well defined with clear boundaries to the town and well-laid-out shopping streets. Letterkenny, [in the Republic] by contrast, appears as just one long street with bungalow development trailing off over all the surrounding hills." The houses (ofter disparaged as "McMansions") are also criticised for spoiling countryside scenery: Monaghan County Council in 2013 declared that "The Council will resist development that would create or extend ribbon development." Tipperary County Council and many other councils have adopted similar policies.

Recently, in places such as Flanders, Belgium, regional zoning policy has resulted in ribbon development patterns. Various spatial policies embedded in these plans help predict where ribbon developments may occur and at what rate.

Criticisms

Increased congestion 
Due to the main road being flanked by homes or commercial establishments, stoppages in traffic may frequently occur as a result of deliveries or vehicles entering or exiting driveways. This can pose danger for other vehicles that may not see entering traffic, especially if the road is bordered by garages. Residents may also choose to walk alongside the road, an activity made more dangerous by fast-moving traffic.

Utility access 
For as simple as linear construction emanating from a city is, the length of a ribbon corridor can pose financial concerns for utility companies as they serve buildings. Density is preferable for utility grids, thereby risking poor access for far-away buildings.

Disruptions during construction 
Construction of a new home or building within a ribbon development may severely disrupt the flow of vehicles along the road because there are no feeder streets for construction vehicles to station on. Traffic may be forced into a singular lane or subjected to an alternating pattern.

Obstruction of countryside 
Because most ribbon developments exist in rural areas outside of cities, properties can disturb or obstruct the natural landscapes along the road may be constructed along an overlook, removing the public's ability to enjoy the landscape in favor of a single property owner.

Municipal boundaries 
Elongated ribbon developments also pose challenges for municipal governments as they partition out rural areas for townships and schools. Rather than development in small towns where schools and other public amenities reside, certain locations within a ribbon development may be difficult to serve by a government and, in turn, cost more in public expenditures.

See also
Green belt
Linear village
One-off housing
Towards an Urban Renaissance
Urban Sprawl

References

Urban planning
Urban studies and planning terminology